Samir El-Najjar (born 2 July 1956) is a Syrian judoka. He competed in the men's extra-lightweight event at the 1980 Summer Olympics.

References

1956 births
Living people
Syrian male judoka
Olympic judoka of Syria
Judoka at the 1980 Summer Olympics
Place of birth missing (living people)
20th-century Syrian people